Dickleburgh and Rushall is a civil parish in South Norfolk.

Toponymy 
The name 'Dickleburgh' means 'Dicel's/Dicla's fortification'. The specific might also be a place-name: Dic-leah, 'wood/clearing of Diss' or 'ditch wood/clearing'.

The name 'Rushall' means perhaps, 'Rif's nook of land' or the first element may be Old English 'hrif', 'belly/womb', used in some topographical sense.

Creation
The parish comprises the two old parishes (pre-1973) Dickleburgh and Rushall.

Electoral ward
This parish also forms part of the electoral ward of Dickleburgh. This ward stretches north to Great Moulton with a total population taken at the 2011 Census of 2,814.

Notes

http://kepn.nottingham.ac.uk/map/place/Norfolk/Rushall
http://kepn.nottingham.ac.uk/map/place/Norfolk/Dickleburgh

External links

Dickleburgh and Rushall Parish Council
St Mary's on the European Round Tower Churches website

Civil parishes in Norfolk
South Norfolk